Şeyhhacı (between 1960 and 2014: Yukarıbağ) is a village in the Elazığ District of Elazığ Province in Turkey. Its population is 428 (2021). The village is populated by Turks.

References

Villages in Elazığ District